Achani (Accāṇi) is a 1973 Indian Malayalam-language film, directed by A. Vincent and produced by K. Ravindran Nair. The film stars Prem Nazir, Nanditha Bose, Adoor Bhasi and Kottarakkara Sreedharan Nair. It tells the story of a tailor and the trials and tribulations of his family. The film was a commercial success and the proceeds from the film was donated by the producer for the construction of a Quilon Public Library in Quilon, Kerala. The film was adapted from the Tamil stage play of same name written by Karaikudi Narayanan.

Plot

Cast 

 Prem Nazir as Vasu
 Nanditha Bose as Seetha
 Adoor Bhasi as Kaimal
 Sankaradi as Banker Menon
 Kottarakkara Sreedharan Nair as Raghavan Muthalali
 Bahadoor as Appu
 Vincent as Gopi
 Sudheer as Babu
 Sujatha as Uma
 Meena as Srimathi Raghavan
 Philomina as Mariammam
 Sreelatha as Kalyani
 Master Sathyajith
 Master Prasad
 K. J. Yesudas (Guest appearance as himself)
 John Varghees
 J.A.R Anand
 Ramankutty Nair
 Raghava Menon
 Aravindhakshan
 Vijaya

Soundtrack 
The music was composed by G. Devarajan, with lyrics by P. Bhaskaran. The songs of the film were hits during the time, especially "Ente Swapnathin", sung playback and on screen by K. J. Yesudas.

References

External links 
 

1973 films
1970s Malayalam-language films
Films with screenplays by Thoppil Bhasi
Films directed by A. Vincent
Indian films based on plays